Diraklu (also Romanized as Dīraklū; also known as Thirk ‘Ali and Tork ‘Alī) is a village in Qaslan Rural District, Serishabad District, Qorveh County, Kurdistan Province, Iran. At the 2006 census, its population was 137, in 26 families. The village is populated by Azerbaijanis.

References 

Towns and villages in Qorveh County
Azerbaijani settlements in Kurdistan Province